The Wianno Senior is a  gaff rigged sloop. The boat is raced on Nantucket Sound by four Cape Cod yacht clubs: Bass River Yacht Club, Hyannis Yacht Club, Hyannis Port Yacht Club, and Wianno Yacht Club.

Design 
The boat was designed in 1913−14 in the village of Osterville, Cape Cod, Massachusetts, for a group of sailors from the Wianno Yacht Club. They requested Horace Manley Crosby to design a sailboat for racing on Nantucket Sound. Manley Crosby was a member of the Crosby family, noted for building the famous Crosby catboats. Fourteen boats were delivered and raced that summer. Those fourteen boats were No. 1 Dione, No. 2 Wendy, No. 3 Telemark, No. 4 A.P.H., No. 5 Commy, No. 6 Snookums, No. 7 Bob White, No. 8 Sea Dog, No. 9 Marie, No. 10 Qui Vive, No. 11 Fantasy, No. 12 Whistle Wing, No. 13 Maxixe, and No. 14 Ethyl. All but two of these original boats have been lost. No. 7 now known as Tirza is in Osterville MA and No. 11 Fantasy is in the collections of Mystic Seaport Museum in Mystic, CT. All the other original boats have been lost due to deterioration, fires, or hurricanes. See the book, The Senior, privately published in 1989 for the boat's 75th anniversary, for more information of the history of the class. That history was adapted from the article "Warriors of Wianno". The book also contains several articles and photos by Wianno Senior owners and sailors.

At about the same time, Wooden Boat magazine published two articles on the Wianno Senior as part of the boat's 75th anniversary. The first, "The Wianno Senior", describes the boat's history and construction and includes several photos. Page 66 shows a photo of, perhaps, the most famous Wianno Senior sailor, President Jack Kennedy. His boat, Victura, hull no. 94, is now on display at the John F. Kennedy Library in the Dorchester neighborhood of Boston, Massachusetts.

The second article in that issue of Wooden Boat is by Jack Fallon. That article provides a short tutorial, Tuning Up with Jack Fallon, on how to sail a Wianno Senior. Jack won the Scudder Cup, the annual class championship, a record nine times between 1949, when the Cup was established, and 1976.

Production 
More recently, Pearl River Productions has published a DVD providing a video history of the Wianno Senior class. That DVD provides updates to the class history beyond the 75th anniversary and discusses the recovery of the class from the devastating boat yard fire on December 10, 2003, in which 21 Seniors were destroyed, 18 of them the classic wooden Seniors.

Two boat yards are still building Wianno Seniors. Crosby Yacht Yard, Inc. in Osterville, Massachusetts, and E M Crosby Boatworks in West Barnstable MA.

Scale 
About 200 Wianno Seniors have been built. Hull numbers through 173 were wooden boats; subsequent boats are being built of fiberglass. Hull number 219 will be launched in 2015 by E M Crosby Boatworks. Several hull numbers were omitted in the sequence.

References

External links
 Osterville Historical Museum: The Home of the Crosby Boats
 Wianno Senior Class Association

Sailing yachts
1910s sailboat type designs